Apiconoma opposita is a moth of the subfamily Arctiinae first described by Francis Walker in 1854. It found in the Brazilian state of Amazonas, French Guiana and Suriname.

References

Moths described in 1854
Phaegopterina
Moths of South America